"Genie" is a song by American rapper YoungBoy Never Broke Again. It was released on April 4, 2018, as a promotional single from his debut studio album Until Death Call My Name, with an accompanying music video.

Composition and lyrics
The song finds NBA YoungBoy discussing his mistakes and legal issues ("I got my static when you ride with me / We got pulled over no you ain't going to do no time for me / I put my hands up police drew down on me / So many charges make me wanna go way over seas"), as well as not being able to "find a woman in the mold of his mother".

Music video
The music video features shots of YoungBoy's arrest in February 2018, and finds him rapping in his front courtyard.

Charts

Certifications

References

2018 singles
2018 songs
Songs written by YoungBoy Never Broke Again
YoungBoy Never Broke Again songs